The second election to the Neath Port Talbot County Borough Council was held on 6 May 1999.  It was preceded by the  1995 election and followed by the 2004 election.  On the same day there were elections to  the other 21 local authorities in Wales and community councils in Wales.

Overview
All council seats were up for election. These were the second elections held following local government reorganisation.

|}

Candidates
Most sitting members of West Glamorgan County council sought election to the new authority. A number were also members of the previous district councils but others contested a ward against a sitting district councillor.

Results

Aberavon (three seats)

Aberdulais (one seat)

Alltwen (one seat)

Baglan (three seats)

Blaengwrach (one seat)

Briton Ferry East (one seat)

Briton Ferry West (one seat)

Bryn and Cwmavon (three seats)

Bryncoch North (one seat)

Bryncoch South (two seats)

Cadoxton (one seat)

Cimla (two seats)

Coedffranc Central (two seats)
Former Communist Glaslyn Morgan was elected as Democratic Left candidate in 1995 but subsequently joined Plaid Cymru.

Coedffranc North (one seat)

Coedffranc West (one seat)

Crynant (one seat)

Cwmllynfell (one seat)

Cymmer (one seat)

Dyffryn (one seat)
Plaid Cymru won the seat in 1995 but lost it at a subsequent by-election.

Glyncorrwg  (one seat)

Glynneath (two seats)

Godre'r Graig (one seat)

Gwaun Cae Gurwen (one seat)

Gwynfi (one seat)

Lower Brynamman (one seat)

Margam (one seat)

Neath East (three seats)

Neath North (two seats)
Clive Thomas had captured a seat from Labour at a by-election.

Neath South (two seats)

Onllwyn (one seat)

Pelenna (one seat)

Pontardawe (two seats)

Port Talbot (three seats)

Resolven (one seat)

Rhos (one seat)

Sandfields East (three seats)

Sandfields West (three seats)
Patricia Jane Thomas had held the seat in a by-election since 1995.

Seven Sisters (one seat)

Taibach (two seats)

Tonna (one seat)

Trebanos (one seat)

Ystalyfera (one seat)

References

1999 Welsh local elections
1999